The 2021–22 Magyar Kupa (English: Hungarian Cup) is the 82nd season of Hungary's annual knock-out cup football competition. The title holders were Újpest FC by winning the 2021 Magyar Kupa Final.

Format

Teams

Round of 64 

Notes
 Note 1: The match between Nyíregyháza Spartacus FC and Honvéd was played at the Balmazújvárosi Városi Sportpálya in Balmazújváros due to the reconstruction of the Városi Stadion in Nyíregyháza.

Round of 32

Round of 16

Quarter-finals

Semi-finals

Final

See also 
 2021–22 Nemzeti Bajnokság I
 2021–22 Nemzeti Bajnokság II
 2021–22 Nemzeti Bajnokság III

References

External links 
 Official site 
 soccerway.com

Cup
Hungary
Magyar Kupa seasons